The Prezë Castle is a medieval castle in Prezë, Albania.

Preza Castle was built by the Byzantine emperor Justinian the Great in the 550s.

The castle overlooks the village with the same name and is located on a hilltop. The castle was enlarged by a construction  which started in the 14th century and was completed in the early 15th century and belonged to the Thopias, a local Albanian feudal family. During 1443-1468 it was one of the core strongholds of the Albanian resistance against the Ottoman Empire led by Skanderbeg.

The castle has been declared a 'monument of culture'. It has four towers, one in each corner. The clock tower was erected around 1800–50. It is known for its beautiful location, overlooking the Tirana plain. The castle is quite close to the Mother Teresa International Airport. A restaurant named Kalaja E Prezës and other service facilities are found inside the castle.

See also
 Landmarks in Tirana
 Architecture of Albania

Castles in Albania
Buildings and structures in Vorë
Tourist attractions in Tirana County